The Strabane and Letterkenny Railway was a  narrow gauge railway line between Strabane, County Tyrone and Letterkenny, County Donegal in Ireland.

History

The County Donegal Railways Joint Committee (CDRJC) constructed the Strabane and Letterkenny Railway. It opened for public service on 1 January 1909 with a route length of 19.25 miles.

It was the last railway constructed by the CDRJC bringing the network operated by this company to 121 miles.

The company pioneered the use of diesel operated railcars, but despite this innovation, closure came at the end of 1959, and the railway was shut on 1 January 1960.

Stations
Strabane
Lifford Halt
Ballindrait
Coolaghy Halt
Raphoe
Convoy
Cornagillagh Halt
Glenmaquin
Letterkenny

See also
 List of narrow gauge railways in Ireland

Notes

Transport companies of the Republic of Ireland
Closed railways in Ireland
Closed railways in Northern Ireland
Transport in County Donegal
Transport in County Tyrone
3 ft gauge railways in Ireland
Railway lines opened in 1909
Strabane